Melete salacia is a butterfly in the family Pieridae. It is found in Mexico and on Hispaniola and Cuba. The habitat consists of mesic hardwood forests.

Adults feed on flower nectar of a variety of flowers, including Asclepias, Palicourea barbinervia, Cordia globosa, Lantana ovatifolia, Morinda citrifolia, Tournefortia hirsutissima, Ageratum conyzoides, Coffea arabica and Croton barahonensis.

Subspecies
The following subspecies are recognised:
Melete salacia salacia (Mexico)
Melete salacia cubana Fruhstorfer, 1908 (Hispaniola, Cuba)

References

Pierini
Butterflies described in 1819
Taxa named by Jean-Baptiste Godart
Butterflies of North America
Butterflies of the Caribbean